"Love Paradox" is the 4th single from American born gravure model Leah Dizon. It was released March 26, 2008 and features an "internationally flavored pop upper." It came in two versions just like previous releases, CD only Version and Limited Edition CD+DVD Version. The CD only version was originally said to feature "Love Paradox (Bach Logic Remix)", but later for unknown reasons was removed. The lyrics for "Love Paradox" were created by Leah Dizon, Mika Atata, and Yunki Shori.

Track listing

CD track listing

 Love Paradox
 Under the Same Sky
 Love Paradox (Instrumental)
 Under the Same Sky (Instrumental)

DVD track listing

 Love Paradox (music video)
 Making-of footage (video clip)

Charts
Oricon Sales Chart (Japan)

Leah Dizon songs
2008 singles
2008 songs
Victor Entertainment singles